Brodie Seger (born 28 December 1995) is a World Cup alpine ski racer from Canada, and specializes in the speed events of super-G and downhill. He made his World Cup debut in November 2017 at Lake Louise, Alberta.

In his first World Championships in 2021 at Cortina d'Ampezzo, Italy, Seger was fourth in the super-G.

In January 2022, Seger was named to Canada's 2022 Olympic team.

World Cup results

Season standings

Top twenty finishes
 0 top tens

World Championship results

Olympic results

References

External links
 
 
 Brodie Seger at Alpine Canada

1995 births
Living people
Canadian male alpine skiers
Alpine skiers at the 2022 Winter Olympics
Olympic alpine skiers of Canada